The Cooper Site is an archaeological site in Lyme, Connecticut. On a terrace of the Connecticut River near Hamburg Cove, the site has yielded evidence of Middle to Late Woodland occupation.  The Late Woodland component includes evidence interpreted as the site of a wigwam, with a large number of stone chips consistent with the development of stone tools at the site.  The Middle Woodland component is interpreted as a series of small camps whose occupation was relatively brief.  Finds at the site have been dated as far back as c. 500 CE, and include narrow-stemmed projectile points, most of which were made from local quartz, but also from more distant chert and hornfels, some which is from quarries as far off as New Jersey.  Pottery finds include fragments with dentate stamping.

The site was listed on the National Register of Historic Places in 1987.

See also
National Register of Historic Places listings in New London County, Connecticut

References

Lyme, Connecticut
Archaeological sites in New London County, Connecticut
Archaeological sites on the National Register of Historic Places in Connecticut
National Register of Historic Places in New London County, Connecticut